Paul Voß (anglicised as Voss; born March 26, 1986 in Rostock) is a German road bicycle racer, who currently rides for German amateur team RSK Potsdam.

Major results

Road

2007
 5th Overall Thüringen Rundfahrt der U23
 7th Sparkassen Giro Bochum
2008
 2nd  Road race, UEC European Under-23 Road Championships
 2nd Ronde van Noord-Holland
 8th Liège–Bastogne–Liège U23
 9th Overall Thüringen Rundfahrt der U23
2010
 1st Stage 1 (ITT) Volta a Catalunya
 6th Overall Driedaagse van West-Vlaanderen
2011
 1st  Overall Cinturó de l'Empordà
1st Stage 1
 3rd Overall Tour du Gévaudan Languedoc-Roussillon
 4th Overall Czech Cycling Tour
1st Stage 1 (TTT)
2012
 1st  Mountains classification Mi-Août Bretonne
 2nd Tartu GP
 5th Overall Tour du Gévaudan Languedoc-Roussillon
 5th Paris–Bourges
 6th Overall Settimana Internazionale di Coppi e Bartali
 7th Druivenkoers Overijse
 10th Overall Vuelta a Murcia
2013
 5th Road race, National Road Championships
 9th Brabantse Pijl
2014
 5th Overall Arctic Race of Norway
 7th Grand Prix of Aargau Canton
2015
 1st Stage 1 (TTT) Giro del Trentino
 8th Overall Tour of Alberta
2016
 1st Rudi Altig Race
 9th Trofeo Serra de Tramuntana
 Tour de France
Held  after Stage 1

Grand Tour general classification results timeline

Cyclo-cross

2003–2004
 1st  National Junior Championships
2004–2005
 2nd National Under-23 Championships
2005–2006
 10th UCI Under-23 World Championships
2007–2008
 Under-23 Superprestige
2nd Diegem
 Under-23 GvA Trophy
2nd Azencross
 UCI Under-23 World Cup
3rd Liévin
3rd Hofstade
3rd Milan
 9th UCI Under-23 World Championships
2008–2009
 2nd Frankfurter Rad-Cross
 3rd National Championships
2009–2010
 3rd National Championships

References

External links

1986 births
Living people
German male cyclists
Sportspeople from Rostock
Cyclo-cross cyclists
Cyclists from Mecklenburg-Western Pomerania